The 2019 Buffalo Bulls football team represented the University at Buffalo in the 2019 NCAA Division I FBS football season. The Bulls were led by fifth-year head coach Lance Leipold and played their home games at the University at Buffalo Stadium as members of the East Division of the Mid-American Conference.

Previous season
The Bulls finished the 2018 season with a 10–4 overall record, including going 7–1, in MAC play to finish first in the East Division and clinch their first ever MAC East Division title before losing to Troy in the Dollar General Bowl.

Preseason

MAC media poll
The MAC released their preseason media poll on July 23, 2019, with the Bulls predicted to finish in third place in the East Division.

Schedule          

Source:

Game summaries

Robert Morris

at Penn State

at Liberty

Temple

at Miami (OH)

Ohio

at Akron

Central Michigan

at Eastern Michigan

at Kent State

Toledo

Bowling Green

vs. Charlotte (Bahamas Bowl)

Roster

References

Buffalo
Buffalo Bulls football seasons
Bahamas Bowl champion seasons
Buffalo Bulls football